Centum Investment Company Plc, commonly known as Centum is a public East African investment company. It operates as an affiliate of the Kenyan government-owned Industrial and Commercial Development Corporation (ICDC).

Overview
Centum is a publicly owned investment company with headquarters in Nairobi, Kenya. Its shares are listed on the Nairobi Securities Exchange (NSE), where they trade under the symbol: CTUM. The company shares are also cross-listed on the Uganda Securities Exchange (USE), where they trade under the symbol "CENT". Centum is an investment channel providing investors access to a portfolio of inaccessible, quality, diversified investments.

Centum's mission is to create real, tangible wealth by providing the channel through which investors access and build extraordinary enterprises in Africa. As of March 2019 Centum's total assets were KSh 101,764,000,000 (US$1,002,490,000) with shareholder's equity of KSh51,576,000,000 (US$508,083,000).

History
ICDC was founded in 1954 as a government parastatal, whose primary objective was to provide a vehicle for Kenyans to invest in the economy of newly independent Kenya by investing in Kenyan companies. In 1967, ICDC formed the subsidiary ICDC Investment Company Limited, whose shares were listed on the NSE.

In 1998, with the Government of Kenya having sold some of its majority shareholding, ICDC Investment Company adopted a new management structure, handing over day-to-day management to an independent professional managerial team, supervised by an independent board of directors elected by the shareholders.

In 2008, the shareholders changed the name of the company to Centum Investment Company Limited. The shares of Centum Investment Company Limited have been publicly traded on the NSE since 1967 and on the USE since 10 February 2011. Over time, Centum's strategy has evolved in line with the company's growth with Centum currently in its 2014 - 2019 strategic period dubbed "Centum 3.0". Under Centum 3.0, the company maintains focus through 4 distinct business lines namely Real Estate, Private Equity, Development and Marketable Securities.

Investment Overview
Centum's investments are organised into four key verticals:

Real Estate Portfolio 
This division is involved in real estate development in Kenya and Uganda, with an eye to expanding into other countries in the African Great Lakes region. These include:
Athena Properties Limited - 100 shareholding - A real estate management, ownership, and development company. 
Two Rivers Development Limited - 58.3 percent shareholding - 102-acre development in Kenya's diplomatic blue zone.
Vipingo Development - 100 percent shareholding - 10,254-acre development off the Kenyan coast.
Pearl Marina - 100 percent shareholding - 389-acre development located in Ntabo Peninsula, popularly known as Garuga, by the shores of Lake Victoria in Uganda.

Private Equity Portfolio 
This division acquires equity positions in either publicly or non-publicly-traded companies, mainly in the African Great Lakes region, but increasingly in other parts of the continent as well. Investments under this segment include the beverage, publishing, financial services and utilities businesses. Per its March 2018 annual report, these included:

Financial Services 

Nabo Capital - 100 percent shareholding - A fund manager in Kenya.
Zohari Leasing - 100 percent shareholding - A leasing company in Kenya.

Others 

Isuzu East Africa - 17.8 percent shareholding - A motor vehicle retailer in Kenya and the local subsidiary of American-based General Motors.
NAS Servair - 15 percent shareholding - An on-site airport catering facility supplying over 30 International airlines that fly into and out of the Jomo Kenyatta International Airport in Nairobi and Moi International Airport in Mombasa.
Longhorn Publishers - 60.2 percent shareholding - A publishing company listed on the Nairobi Securities Exchange with subsidiaries in Kenya, Uganda, and Tanzania and distribution in Malawi and Rwanda.

Marketable Securities Portfolio 
The Marketable Securities Portfolio comprises investments in securities and fixed income instruments managed by Nabo Capital. The portfolio is broadly diversified across various stock exchanges in Africa and primarily invests in large and mid-capitalization equities while maintaining sizeable allocations to fixed income and cash. This segment represents 8.2% of Centum's portfolio value.

Development Portfolio 
This represents investments, outside from real estate, that are still under development.  the development portfolio consists of;

 Greenblade Growers Limited - 100 percent shareholding - A vertically integrated grower, processor and exporter of fresh herbs, vegetables and fruits from Kenya.
 Africa Crest Education Holdings - 16.4 percent shareholding - An investment holding company whose objective is establishing SABIS® operated K-12 schools across the African continent.
 Akiira Geothermal Limited - 37.5 percent shareholding - The first private sector greenfield geothermal development in Sub-Saharan Africa.
 Amu Power Company - 51 percent shareholding - A power generation company.

Former investments

In 2014, Centum exited two investment funds Helios and Nigeria-based African Capital Alliance where total investments were valued at KShs 500 million.
Rift Valley Railways - 10 percent shareholding previously held - A consortium that was established in 2005 to manage the Uganda Railway parastatal railways of Kenya and Uganda. This investment was exited in 2012 to Qalaa Holdings.
UAP Holdings - 14 percent shareholding previously held - An investment, retirement, and insurance services group that operates mainly in East Africa. Centum exited this investment in 2015 through a direct sale to Old Mutual.
Kenya Wine Agencies Limited - 26 percent shareholding previously held - A leading manufacturer, distributor, and importer of wines and spirits in East Africa. This investment exited this investment in 2017 through a direct sale to Distell.
Carbacid Investments - 22 percent shareholding previously held - A manufacturer and marketer of carbon dioxide gas for industrial and medical use as well as dry ice. This investment ended in 2011.
GenAfrica Asset Managers  - 73.4 percent shareholding - The second largest fund manager in Kenya. This investment was exited in 2018.
 Aon Insurance Brokers - 22 percent shareholding - An insurance brokerage and consulting services company and the Kenyan subsidiary of Aon Plc.This investment was exited in 2016.
Platcorp Holdings - Owner of Platinum Credit. 45 percent shareholding. A short term financing company with subsidiaries in Kenya, Uganda, and Tanzania. This investment was exited in 2018.

 Almasi Beverages Limited - 53.8 percent shareholding - The second largest Coca-Cola bottling franchise in Kenya.
 Nairobi Bottlers - 27.6 percent shareholding - The largest of the Coca-Cola franchises in Kenya.
King Beverage Limited - 100 percent shareholding - Sole distributor for Danish beer manufacturer Carlsberg brands and select Edrington Products and Grays spirits in Kenya.
Sidian Bank - 77 percent shareholding - A commercial bank in Kenya, licensed by the Central Bank of Kenya, the national banking regulator. The bank was sold to Access Bank Group of Nigeria in June 2022, for US$37 million and merged into Access Bank Kenya.

Ownership
As of 31 March 2018, the company stock was owned by corporate entities and individuals. The ten largest shareholders are listed in the table below:

See also
 Kenya Wine Agencies Limited 
 Uganda Securities Exchange
 K-Rep Bank
 UAP Holdings
 Longhorn Kenya Limited
 Carbacid Investments
 Rift Valley Railways Consortium

References

External links
 Centum Homepage
Inside Centum’s unique bonus payment scheme As of 29 September 2017.
Centum Has Firm Grip On Its Growing Investment Bag

Companies based in Nairobi
Conglomerate companies of Kenya
Financial services companies established in 1967
Companies listed on the Nairobi Securities Exchange
Companies listed on the Uganda Securities Exchange
Kenyan companies established in 1967